Malaysia–Qatar relations (Jawi: هوبوڠن مليسيا–قطر) are foreign relations between Malaysia and Qatar. Malaysia has an embassy in Doha, and Qatar has an embassy in Kuala Lumpur since 2004.

Economic relations 
The relations between the two countries are mainly in the economic relations. In 2011, both countries has announced a US$2 billion joint investment fund and the signing of co-operation agreements in the fields of tourism and higher education. Many Malaysians companies also had secured a total of 25 projects in Qatar. While in 2013, the Qatar Airways plans to expand its services into Malaysia by working with the Malaysia Airlines. Qatar also has expressed its interest on the local aviation industry in one of the Malaysian state, Sarawak along with the investments in energy, industry and halal production. In 2018, the two countries signed a memorandum of understanding (MoU) to expand the reach of women entrepreneurs in global markets.

Al Jazeera's documentary controversy 

In 2020, amidst the COVID-19 pandemic in Malaysia, Al Jazeera, a Qatari state-owned and multinational media corporation, broadcast a documentary called Locked Up in Malaysia's Lockdown about the lockdown of Malaysia and its negative effects on the migrant population. However, this has led to tensions between Malaysia and Qatar to arise, as Malaysian government has deemed it "sedition", and had arrested a Bangladeshi migrant who criticized Malaysia's handling efforts, which eventually led to his deportation. Tensions between Qatar and Malaysia further escalated when Malaysian authorities decided to raid the bureau of the channel and interrogating Al Jazeera journalists for their work in the country.

In Malaysia, the outrage could also be witnessed in public, as Malaysian nationals have demanded an apology from the channel and launched attack on its website. There has been speculation that Saudi Arabia may have been behind the attempt to tarnish Al Jazeera's image in Malaysia. However, as for the result, relationship between Malaysia and Qatar has been heavily soured.

Further reading 
 SPEECH AT THE BUSINESS FORUM MALAYSIA-QATAR BUSINESS OPPORTUNITIES Malaysia Prime Minister Office
 Malaysian King Receives Credentials of Qatar's Ambassador Ministry of Foreign Affairs, Qatar

References 

 
Qatar
Bilateral relations of Qatar